Felicitas and Gonzalo Mendez High School is a public high school in the Boyle Heights neighborhood of Los Angeles, California, United States. It is also known as Felicitas and Gonzalo Mendez Learning Center.

History

The school is named after Felicitas and Gonzalo Mendez, parents of American civil rights activist Sylvia Mendez who at eight years old, played an instrumental role in the Mendez v. Westminster case, the landmark desegregation case of 1946. The case successfully ended de jure segregation in California.

It was the first high school to open in Boyle Heights in 28 years.

Kyle Darren Jones was inaugurated as the ASB President on June 10, 2019, at 6:54 pm at the Class of 2019 Graduation Ceremony. He is the first African-American president in the school's history.

Campus
The school was built to alleviate the overcrowded Roosevelt High School. The site was designated in 2003, broke ground in 2006, and the campus opened in September 2009.

The building occupies  and contains 38 classrooms. It was designed by Nadel Architects and Barrio Planners and was built by Hensel Phelps Construction at a cost of $108 million. The site attained a Collaborative for High Performance Schools score of 24.

Rankings 

US News 2021 Rankings
54 in Los Angeles Unified School District High Schools
246 in Los Angeles metropolitan area High Schools
581 in California High Schools
3,827 in National Rankins

US News 2020 Rankings
88 in Los Angeles Unified School District High Schools
218 in Los Angeles metropolitan area High Schools
501 in California High Schools
3,338 in National Rankins

References

External links
 

High schools in Los Angeles
Public high schools in California
Boyle Heights, Los Angeles
2009 establishments in California